Teofan I, Serbian Patriarch (also spelled Theophanes) was the archbishop of the Serbian Patriarchate of Peć and the Patriarch of the Serbian Orthodox Church from 1435 to 1446.He was succeeded by Nikodim II.

On the enthronement of Patriarch Dimitrije in Peć, Stevan Dimitrijević published a list of Serbian archbishops and patriarchs which mentions Teofan as the successor to Patriarch Nikon (1419-1435).

Sources 
 Народна енциклопедија (National Encyclopedia, 1927)
  (In translation )

See also
 List of heads of the Serbian Orthodox Church

References 

1446 deaths
Date of birth unknown
Archbishops of the Serbian Orthodox Church

Year of birth missing